Northwell Health is a nonprofit integrated healthcare network that is New York State's largest healthcare provider and private employer, with more than 81,000 employees. 
  
The flagship hospitals of Northwell are North Shore University Hospital and Long Island Jewish Medical Center (LIJ Medical Center).

History 
Prior to 2015, the network was called North Shore-Long Island Jewish Health System (North Shore-LIJ). 
  
In 2019, Northwell had 23 hospitals and more than 700 outpatient facilities, as well as the Donald and Barbara Zucker School of Medicine at Hofstra/Northwell, the Feinstein Institutes for Medical Research, urgent care centers, kidney dialysis centers, acute inpatient rehabilitation, sub-acute rehabilitation and skilled-nursing facilities, a home care network, a hospice network, and other services. 
  
More recently, the company signed a deal with software technology company Playback Health, to launch platforms for patient medical information to retain their healthcare data. 
  

Hospitals 
The following hospitals and medical facilities are part of Northwell Health. All locations are in New York.

Northwell Nurse Choir 
In 2020, during the ongoing COVID-19 pandemic, a choir was formed consisting of 18 nurses from the organization who had worked on the frontline to aid those affected by the virus. All members who took part conducted virtual performances, with the choir created to support the nonprofit Nurse Heroes group. The group came to prominence in 2021 when they auditioned on the 16th season of America's Got Talent.

References

External links
  
  
 
 

 
Companies based in Nassau County, New York
Hospital networks in the United States
Medical and health organizations based in New York (state)
Town of North Hempstead, New York
1997 establishments in New York (state)
Companies established in 1997
America's Got Talent contestants